Francis H. Mahoney (November 20, 1927 – April 29, 2008) was an American professional basketball player. He had a brief stint in the National Basketball Association (NBA) during the 1950s.

Biography
Born in Brooklyn, New York, he was a 6'2" (1.88 m) and 205 lb (93 kg) forward and he attended Brown University, where he earned a Bachelor of Arts degree in English. He served in the U.S. Army during the Korean War from 1950 to 1952, and later in the U.S. Army Reserves until 1956. He was selected in the sixth round of the 1950 NBA Draft by the Boston Celtics. He played the 1952–53 season with the Celtics, averaging 2.0 points, 1.2 rebounds and 0.2 assists per game in 6 games. His final season in the league, in 1953–54, was spent with the Baltimore Bullets, playing only two games in 11 total minutes, grabbing 2 rebounds and dishing out one assist.

After his NBA career Mahoney played for the semi-professional Lenox Merchants, and served as a basketball coach at Berkshire Community College and the former Stockbridge School. In addition, he worked as an electrician for many years, and taught English at Berkshire Community College and Monument Mountain Regional High School. He also worked for General Motors in New York City. He and his wife were depicted in a Norman Rockwell painting, Marriage License. He was a member of the Irish American Club of Berkshire County and the NBA Players Association.

Mahoney died at Springside of Pittsfield in Pittsfield, Massachusetts, aged 80. He was survived by his wife, two daughters, two sons, and eight grandchildren.

Notes

External links
"Francis Mahoney"  Historical player profile, at nba.com
Francis Mahoney NBA stats, basketballreference.com
Norman Rockwell - The Marriage License - Art Print, globalgallery.com

1927 births
2008 deaths
20th-century American educators
United States Army personnel of the Korean War
American Basketball League (1925–1955) players
American electricians
American men's basketball players
Baltimore Bullets (1944–1954) players
Basketball coaches from New York (state)
Basketball players from New York City
Berkshire Community College faculty
Boston Celtics draft picks
Boston Celtics players
Brown Bears men's basketball players
General Motors people
Pawtucket Slaters (basketball) players
Sportspeople from Berkshire County, Massachusetts
Schoolteachers from New York (state)
Small forwards
Sportspeople from Brooklyn
United States Army reservists